Bessel van der Kolk (born 1943) is a psychiatrist, author, researcher and educator based in Boston, United States. Since the 1970s his research has been in the area of post-traumatic stress. He is the author of The New York Times best seller, The Body Keeps the Score. Van der Kolk formerly served as president of the International Society for Traumatic Stress Studies, and is a former co-director of the National Child Traumatic Stress Network. He is a professor of psychiatry at Boston University School of Medicine and president of the Trauma Research Foundation in Brookline, Massachusetts.

Van der Kolk has published over 150 peer-reviewed scientific articles. His books include Post-traumatic Stress Disorder (1984), Psychological Trauma  (1987), Traumatic Stress (1996, with Alexander C. McFarlane  and Lars Weisæth) and The Body Keeps the Score (2014).

Early life and education 
Van der Kolk was born in the Netherlands in 1943. He studied a pre-medical curriculum with a political science major at the University of Hawaii in 1965. He gained his M.D. at the Pritzker School of Medicine, University of Chicago, in 1970, and completed his psychiatric residency at the Massachusetts Mental Health Center, Harvard Medical School, in 1974.

After his training, van der Kolk worked as a director of Boston State Hospital and then became a staff psychiatrist at the Boston Veterans Administration Outpatient Clinic, where he acquired his interest in studying traumatic stress.

Career
Van der Kolk started the Trauma Center in Brookline, Massachusetts, in 1982 when he was working as a junior faculty member at Harvard Medical School. Since then, he has conducted numerous training programs and clinical trials. He did extensive studies on the nature of traumatic memory, and he took a leading role in the first studies on the psychopharmacological treatments of PTSD. He conducted some of the first studies on the biological substrates of PTSD  and on stress-induced analgesia. He was involved in the first neuroimaging studies of PTSD and of Dissociative Identity Disorder, and he received the first grants from the National Institutes of Health to study EMDR and yoga.

He has a particular interest in developmental psychopathology, studying how trauma has a differential effect, depending on developmental stage and the security of the attachment system, and he coined the term "Developmental Trauma Disorder" for the complex range of psychological and biological reactions to trauma over the course of human development.

In 1999 he initiated the creation of the National Child Traumatic Stress Network, which by 2019 had grown in to a network of 150 sites specializing in treating traumatized children and their families around the US. He has advocated innovative treatments for traumatic stress in children and adults, such as trauma-sensitive yoga, embodied therapies, neurofeedback, and psychedelic therapies.

Since 1989, he has been course director of the annual Boston International Trauma Conference, which brings together leading scientists and clinicians specializing in trauma, developmental psychopathology, attachment studies, body-oriented therapies, theater and expressive arts.

In 2017, van der Kolk was terminated from the parent organization of the Trauma Center, Justice Resource Institute, due to allegations of creating a hostile environment that allowed van der Kolk, then executive director of the Trauma Center, to engage in abusive practices. Van der Kolk stated that the termination was an attempt by the Justice Resource Institute to mitigate its own legal responsibility for the alleged misconduct. The executive team of the Trauma Center unanimously protested this termination, and all senior members of the Trauma Center resigned. Van der Kolk filed a lawsuit against the Justice Resource Institute for several counts of action including misrepresentation and defamation. The suit ended in a Non-Disclosure Agreement (NDA). The suit was settled quickly out of court. In 2020, the Trauma Center at the Justice Resource Institute closed permanently.

In May 2018, van der Kolk used the funds won in his settlement with the Justice Resource Institute to found the Trauma Research Foundation.

Van der Kolk teaches within the United States and internationally, having taught all over Europe as well as in China, Japan, Australia, Indonesia, India, New Zealand, Egypt, Israel, the UAE, Turkey and South Africa.

Books 
 Van der Kolk, B. A., ed. Post-traumatic Stress Disorder: Psychological and Biological Sequelae. Washington DC: American Psychiatric, 1984.
 Van der Kolk, B. A., Psychological Trauma. Washington DC: American Psychiatric, 1987.
 Van der Kolk, B. A., McFarlane, Alexander C., Weisæth, L (editors): Traumatic Stress: the effects of overwhelming experience on mind, body and society. New York: Guilford, 1996
 The Body Keeps the Score: Brain, Mind, and Body in the Healing of Trauma. Viking, 2014. . Hardcover. 464 pages. English (translated into 32 different languages)

References

External links 
 
 Trauma Research Foundation

1943 births
Living people
Boston University faculty
Psychotherapists
Kolk, Bessel van der